In mathematics, a product metric is a metric on the Cartesian product of finitely many metric spaces  which metrizes the product topology. The most prominent product metrics are the p product metrics for a fixed  :
It is defined as the p norm of the n-vector of the distances measured in n subspaces:

For  this metric is also called the sup metric:

Choice of norm
For Euclidean spaces, using the L2 norm gives rise to the Euclidean metric in the product space; however, any other choice of p will lead to a topologically equivalent metric space. In the category of metric spaces (with Lipschitz maps having Lipschitz constant 1), the product (in the category theory sense) uses the sup metric.

The case of Riemannian manifolds

 

for  under the natural identification .

References
.
 .

Metric geometry